Clayton D. Potter (January 12, 1880 – September 1, 1924) was a justice of the Supreme Court of Mississippi from 1916 to 1917, and Attorney General of Mississippi from 1922 to 1924.

Biography
Born in Hinds County, Mississippi, near Jackson, Potter was a son of Daniel Mayes Potter and Octavia Smith Potter. He first attended the Liberty Grove school, near Jackson, and later he attended the Jackson public schools. He graduated from the literary department of Millsans college in 1902. He read law to gain admission to the bar in 1904, thereafter practicing in Jackson. From 1905 to 1912, he served in the Mississippi State Senate.

Potter managed the 1915 campaign of Governor Theodore G. Bilbo, and thereafter "was appointed by Governor Bilbo in January 1916 to one of the three new judgeships". When Potter ran for election to the seat, his opponent, George H. Ethridge, made several allegations against Potter, including that Potter "had promised when accepting the governor's January appointment that he would not be a candidate for a full term", and that Potter only wanted the brief appointment to the court to bolster his reputation in practice. Ethridge lead the vote in the August 15 Democratic primary, and won the September 5 runoff by a more substantial margin.

In 1922, Governor Lee M. Russell appointed Potter Attorney General of Mississippi, to fill the vacancy caused by the resignation of Frank Robertson. Potter completed the term and then returned to private practice.

Potter never married. He died in a car accident outside Raymond, Mississippi, at the age of 44.

References

1880 births
1924 deaths
People from Hinds County, Mississippi
Democratic Party Mississippi state senators
Justices of the Mississippi Supreme Court
Mississippi Attorneys General
Road incident deaths in Mississippi